is a Japanese football player who plays as Goalkeeper. He currently play for J2 League club Iwaki FC.

Club statistics
Updated to the start from 2023 season.

Honours
 Iwaki FC
 J3 League: 2022

References

External links
Profile at AC Nagano Parceiro
Profile at Iwaki FC

1989 births
Living people
Nippon Sport Science University alumni
Association football people from Kanagawa Prefecture
Japanese footballers
J1 League players
J2 League players
J3 League players
Japan Football League players
AC Nagano Parceiro players
Matsumoto Yamaga FC players
Iwaki FC players
Association football goalkeepers